MLS Cup 2014 was the 19th edition of the MLS Cup, the match that determined the champion of Major League Soccer's 2014 season. It is also the last MLS Cup to be held before the league's rebranding in 2015. The Western Conference Champions LA Galaxy played the Eastern Conference Champions New England Revolution. The soccer match was held at the Galaxy's home field of the StubHub Center in Carson, California, as the Galaxy were awarded home advantage by finishing the regular season with more points than the Revolution. The Galaxy won 2–1 after Overtime, winning their fifth MLS Cup title and also sending all-time U.S. national team goal scoring leader Landon Donovan into retirement with his sixth MLS Cup crown.

It was a record sixth time that the MLS Cup was held at the StubHub Center, and the first time in two years that the venue has hosted the MLS Cup. The Galaxy returned to the MLS Cup for the first time since 2012, when they became the third club to win the championship in back-to-back seasons. It was the first time since 2007 that the Revolution reached the MLS Cup final. The two clubs had met twice before in the MLS Cup final: in 2002 and in 2005; the Galaxy defeated New England 1–0 after Overtime in both finals. New England Revolution became the first club to lose five MLS Cups.

Going into the match, the Galaxy had earned a berth into the 2015–16 CONCACAF Champions League regardless of the result; New England could only do so by winning the Cup. Since the Seattle Sounders won both the U.S. Open Cup and the Supporters Shield, the Galaxy had secured a berth into the Champions League as the Supporters Shield runner-up. Had New England won the match, they would have entered as the MLS Cup champion representative. Instead, Real Salt Lake went to the Champions League.

Road to the final 

Both teams finished second in their respective conferences at the end of the regular season. The Galaxy convincingly defeated Real Salt Lake in the Western Conference semifinals by an aggregate score of 5–0. They then advanced past Seattle Sounders FC and to MLS Cup 2–2 on aggregate due to the away goals tiebreaker, as the Galaxy had 1 away goal to Seattle's 0. New England knocked out the Columbus Crew 7–3 on aggregate after dominating both legs of the Eastern Conference semifinals before narrowly besting the New York 4–3 over the two legs to reach MLS Cup.

Tournament Bracket

Match

Statistics

References 

2014

LA Galaxy matches
New England Revolution matches
Sports competitions in Carson, California
2014 in sports in California
December 2014 sports events in the United States
21st century in Carson, California